Television in Sudan has a low penetration of around 17%, as many households cannot afford the cost of a satellite dish, and terrestrial television is the dominant platform. There are no private terrestrial television stations, and the government operates Sudanese Radio and Television Corporation.

History and present 
Sudan officially began television transmission in 1963. In the early years, it only reached a short distance from Khartoum.

Sudan has 18 terrestrial channels, just one of which, Blue Nile TV, is not wholly state-owned. Sudan TV is the main terrestrial channel. There are eight free-to-air direct-to-home channels headquartered in Sudan, of which five are privately owned, two are government owned and one has mixed ownership. Pay-TV penetration is negligible in the country.

Censorship 
Sudan TV stations are restricted by a military censor to ensure that the news do not contradict official views and perceived cultural values. Satellite dishes are common in affluent areas and pan-Arab television stations are popular. In addition to domestic and satellite TV services, there was a subscription cable network, which directly rebroadcast uncensored foreign news and other programs. 

The government shut down the Al-Jazeera bureau late in 2003 and arrested the bureau chief for alleged false programming and poor analysis of atrocities in Darfur. The bureau chief went to prison, but Al-Jazeera subsequently reopened the office.

References

 
Television stations